Nikos Golias (born 29 July 1993) is a Greek professional footballer who plays as a centre-back for Super League 2 club Anagennisi Karditsa, for which he is captain.

Career
Golias started his career from the youth team of his hometown A.O. Karditsa in 2011. A year later he joined his other hometown club Anagennisi. On 2 July 2013, he joined Aris Thessaloniki then of Greek Super League. He managed to play in 2 games in the 1st category and stayed in the club after its relegation in the Gamma Ethniki where he had (so far) his most productive season with 28 appearances, until September 2015, when he returned to Anagennisi Karditsa in the Greek Football League. On 10 June 2016, he signed a 3-years contract with AEL. On 25 September 2016 he scored his first Superleague goal in 1-0 home win against Olympiacos.

References

External links
 sport24.gr
 footballleaguenews.gr
 karditsasportiva.gr

1993 births
Living people
Association football defenders
Greek footballers
Super League Greece players
Super League Greece 2 players
Delta Ethniki players
Football League (Greece) players
Athlitiki Enosi Larissa F.C. players
Aris Thessaloniki F.C. players
Anagennisi Karditsa F.C. players
People from Karditsa (regional unit)
Footballers from Thessaly